The lutungs, langurs, or leaf monkeys are a group of Old World monkeys in the genus Trachypithecus (derived from Greek ,  meaning "rough" and ,  meaning "monkey"). Their range is much of Southeast Asia (northeast India, Vietnam, southern China, Borneo, Thailand, Java, and Bali).

The name "lutung" comes from the Sundanese language meaning "blackness", ultimately from Proto-Austronesian *luCuŋ (which originally referred to the Formosan rock macaque); it is preferred in one paper because the authors wanted the name langurs to only refer to monkeys in the genus Semnopithecus, although some "lutungs" are now "langurs" again.

Evolution 

Genetic analysis indicates that the ancestors of the modern species of lutung first differentiated from one another a little over 3 million years ago, during the late Pliocene. The various species alive today then diverged during the Pleistocene, presumably driven by habitat changes during the Ice Ages. The oldest fossils clearly identified as belonging to the genus date from the middle Pleistocene of Vietnam and Laos; later fossils are also known from Thailand, Java, and Sumatra. The closest living relatives of the lutungs are probably either the gray langurs or the surilis, although the exact relationships remain unclear, possibly due to hybridisation between these genera during the course of their recent evolutionary history.

Taxonomy 

As of 2005, the authors of Mammal Species of the World recognize the following Trachypithecus species:
 Genus Semnopithecus 
 formerly T. vetulus group - moved into genus Semnopithecus in most recent classifications
 Purple-faced langur, Semnopithecus vetulus
 Nilgiri langur, Semnopithecus johnii
 Genus Trachypithecus 
 T. cristatus group
 Javan lutung, Trachypithecus auratus
 "Silvery lutung", silvery langur, etc.: Trachypithecus cristatus, but also used for T.  germaini
 Indochinese lutung or Germain's langur, Trachypithecus germaini
 Tenasserim lutung, Trachypithecus barbei
 T. obscurus group
 Dusky leaf monkey, Trachypithecus obscurus
 Phayre's leaf monkey, Trachypithecus phayrei
 T. pileatus group
 Capped langur, Trachypithecus pileatus
 Shortridge's langur, Trachypithecus shortridgei
 Gee's golden langur, Trachypithecus geei
 T. francoisi group
 Francois' langur, Trachypithecus francoisi
 Hatinh langur, Trachypithecus hatinhensis
 "White-headed langur", Trachypithecus poliocephalus
 Laotian langur, Trachypithecus laotum
 Delacour's langur, Trachypithecus delacouri
 Indochinese black langur, Trachypithecus ebenus

Since then, the T. vetulus group (the purple-faced langur and the Nilgiri langur) have been moved the genus Semnopithecus based on DNA and other evidence.

In 2008, Roos et al. described the Malay Peninsula form of the silvery lutung as a separate subspecies and subsequently it has been elevated to a separate species within the T. cristatus group as the Selangor silvered langur, T. selangorensis.  Roos et al. also elevated the West Javan Langur, Trachypithecus mauritius, and  Annamese Langur, Trachypithecus margarita, to species status (formerly subspecies of T. auratus and T. germaini, respectively). In 2020, Roos et al. discovered a new species, Popa langur (T. popa), which is found only in Myanmar.

This leaves the current understanding of the genus Trachypithecus to be:
Trachypithecus cristatus group
East Javan langur, Trachypithecus auratus
West Javan langur, Trachypithecus mauritius
Silvery lutung or silvered leaf monkey, Trachypithecus cristatus
Selangor silvered langur, Trachypithecus selangorensis
Germain's langur, Trachypithecus germaini
Annamese langur, Trachypithecus margarita
Tenasserim lutung, Trachypithecus barbei
Trachypithecus obscurus group
Indochinese grey langur, Trachypithecus crepusculus
Dusky leaf monkey, Trachypithecus obscurus
Phayre's leaf monkey, Trachypithecus phayrei
Popa langur, Trachypithecus popa
Shan State langur, Trachypithecus melamera
Trachypithecus pileatus group
Capped langur, Trachypithecus pileatus
Shortridge's langur, Trachypithecus shortridgei
Gee's golden langur, Trachypithecus geei
Trachypithecus francoisi group
Francois' langur, Trachypithecus francoisi
Hatinh langur, Trachypithecus hatinhensis
Cat Ba langur, Trachypithecus poliocephalus
White-headed langur, Trachypithecus leucocephalus
Laotian langur, Trachypithecus laotum
Delacour's langur, Trachypithecus delacouri
Indochinese black langur, Trachypithecus ebenus

Physical description 

Lutungs have a rather slim build with a long tail. The fur color varies, depending on the species, from black and grey to orange yellow. Many species have skin designs and a brighter lower surface, the hair on the head is often compared to a hood. Their arms are very short in comparison to the feet and their thumbs are also somewhat shorter. The inner surfaces of the hands and feet are hairless so that their fur does not get caught when reaching into branches. These animals reach a length of 40 to 80 cm and a weight of 5 to 15 kg, with males generally larger than females. A bulge over the eyes and other details, primarily in the head, differentiate it from the surilis.

Habitat and distribution 

Lutungs live in the forests, often preferring rain forests, although occasionally they are also found in secluded mountain forests. Lutungs are found in South-east Asia and parts of South Asia from India in the west to China in the east.

Behaviour 

They spend the largest part of the day in the trees, where they crawl along the branches on all fours, although they can also jump well from tree to tree. They are diurnal, although more active in the early mornings and the afternoon.

They live in groups of five to 20 animals, mostly in harems, i.e. a single male with several females. Young males must leave their birth group when fully mature, often forming bachelor groups. If a new male takes over a harem, defeating and scaring off the harem leader, he often kills the children of the group. Lutungs are territorial, with loud shouting to defend their territories from other lutung interlopers, resorting to force if the outsiders are not scared off. They have a common repertoire of sounds with which they warn group members. Also, mutual grooming plays an important role.

Lutungs are herbivores, primarily eating leaves, fruits, and buds. To digest the tough leaves, they developed a multichambered stomach.

Reproduction 

Rarely twins, a typical single birth comes after a seven-month gestation period. Newborns usually have a golden-yellow fur. The mother shares responsibilities of rearing the young with the other females ("aunties") of the harem. They hand the young around, play with it, carry it, and cuddle it, while the mother searches for food. If the mother dies, another female adopts the young animal. Lutungs are weaned in the latter half of their first year, and reach full maturity at 4 to 5 years. The life expectancy is estimated at 20 years.

References

External links 

 Primate Info Net Trachypithecus factsheets